Manndzri bin Hj Nasib is a Malaysian politician, who is a member of the United Malays National Organisation (UMNO), a component party of the Barisan Nasional (BN) coalition. He has served as the Member of Parliament of Tenggara since November 2022.

Early life and education
Born and raised in Johor, Manndzri continued his studies at the University of Science Malaysia in Pulau Pinang, where he graduated with a bachelor's degree in management, with a concentration in marketing.

Early career
Manndzri worked within the Prime Minister's Office, where he was the chief assistant director in the Economic Planning Unit. Moreover, he was also the deputy strategic director within FELDA under the Prime Minister's Office.

Political career
Manndzri is currently the youth chief of the Division of Tenggara, where he was elected as a candidate for the Tenggara parliamentary seat, succeeding the former health minister Adham Baba, who is also the division chief of UMNO Tenggara.

Election result

References

Living people
Malaysian people of Malay descent
Malaysian Muslims
United Malays National Organisation politicians
21st-century Malaysian politicians
Universiti Sains Malaysia alumni
Year of birth missing (living people)